Berg Propulsion is a Swedish company that designs and manufactures controllable-pitch propellers for the marine industry. The company produces customized main propellers, azimuth thrusters, transverse thrusters and manoeuvre systems.

Berg Propulsion has production facilities in Sweden, and sales & service offices in Shanghai, Guangzhou, Dubai, Singapore, and Sweden.

Caterpillar Inc. bought Berg Propulsion in 2013.

Caterpillar Inc. sold Caterpillar Propulsion group back to Berg Propulsion, on 30 June 2020.

Involvement 
Berg Propulsion was a title sponsor of the Puma Ocean Racing, powered by Berg Propulsion racing team for the 2011–12 Volvo Ocean Race.

Berg Propulsion is a corporate partner of the Royal Institution of Naval Architects.

Notes and references

External links 
 External reference: http://www.bergpropulsion.com
 Volvo Ocean Race: http://www.volvooceanrace.com/news/article/2010/APRIL/PUMA-ANNOUNCEMENT-080410/
 Royal Institution of Naval Architects: http://www.rina.org.uk/corporatepartners.html 

Manufacturing companies established in 1912
Manufacturing companies of Sweden
Swedish companies established in 1912